Mattia Guadagnini (born 11 April 2002) is an Italian professional motocross rider.

Biography
Guadagnini was born in Bassano del Grappa in the Veneto region of northern Italy. In 2018 he competed in the 125cc World Youth Championship and came second. In 2019 he managed to become European and World Champion in the 125cc class. At the end of the 2020 EMX250 season, he joined the Red Bull KTM Factory Racing Team De Carli to race the 2021 MX2 Motocross World Championship.

Career statistics

Motocross World Championship
Update after seven events.

References

External links
 Mattia Guadagnini at MXGP
 Mattia Guadagnini at Red Bull

Living people
2002 births
Italian motocross riders
Motorcycle racers of Fiamme Oro
People from Bassano del Grappa
Sportspeople from the Province of Vicenza